Cytoskeletal drugs are small molecules that interact with actin or tubulin. These drugs can act on the cytoskeletal components within a cell in three main ways. Some cytoskeletal drugs stabilize a component of the cytoskeleton, such as taxol, which stabilizes microtubules, or Phalloidin, which stabilizes actin filaments.  Others, such as  Cytochalasin D, bind to actin monomers and prevent them from polymerizing into filaments. Drugs such as demecolcine act by enhancing the depolymerisation of already formed microtubules. Some of these drugs have multiple effects on the cytoskeleton: for example, Latrunculin both prevents actin polymerization as well as enhancing its rate of depolymerization. Typically the microtubule targeting drugs can be found in the clinic where they are used therapeutically in the treatment of some forms of cancer. As a result of the lack of specificity for specific type of actin (i.e. cannot distinguish between cardiac, smooth muscle, muscle and cytoskeletal forms of actin), the use of these drugs in animals results in unacceptable off-target effects. Despite this, the actin targeting compounds are still useful tools that can be used on a cellular level to help further our understanding of how this complex part of the cells' internal machinery operates. For example, Phalloidin that has been conjugated with a fluorescent probe can be used for visualizing the filamentous actin in fixed samples.

Cytochalasin D and Latrunculin are both understood to be toxins developed by certain fungi and sponges to promote the depolymerization of filaments. Specifically, Cytochalasin D is a fungal alkaloid while Latrunculin is a toxin that is secreted by sponges. Although they both result in depolymerization, they have different mechanisms. Cytochalasin D binds to the (+) end of F-actin and blocks the addition of subunits. Contrasting, Latrunculin binds to and sequesters G-actin, thus preventing it from adding to the filament end of F-actin. Upon addition to live cells, Cytochalasin D and Latrunculin disassemble the actin cytoskeleton and inhibit cell movements such as locomotion.

Other toxins secreted by sponges, such as jasplakinolide and phalloidin (phallotoxins), isolated from Amanita phalloides (the “death cap” mushroom), contrasts the function of Cytochalasin D and Latrunculin. Jasplakinolide binds to and stabilizes actin dimers by enhancing nucleation (one of the first phases of G-actin polymerization,) and thus lowering the critical concentration, or the minimum concentration needed to form filaments. Phalloidin prevents filaments from polymerizing by binding between subunits in F-actin and locking them together. The presence of phalloidin in a cell paralyzes it, killing the cell.

Phallotoxins have been isolated from A. phalloides, a type of mushroom, and have been involved in fatal cases of mushroom poisoning. The liver and kidneys of humans are most commonly affected by ingestion of the toxin, and can cause symptoms such as jaundice and seizures to name a few, ultimately resulting in death. Three classes of toxins can be isolated from A. phalloides: amatoxins, phallotoxins, and virotoxins. These toxins can cause deaths within 2-8 hours. Similarly to the phallotoxins, the virotoxins interact with actin and prevent filament depolymerization. Ultimately, these toxins disrupt the functions of the cytoskeleton, paralyzing susceptible cells.

See also 

Actin-binding protein

References 

Actin inhibitors
Microtubule inhibitors
Mitotic inhibitors